Notoxus is a large genus of beetles that resemble ants. It comprises about 300 species worldwide.

Species
These species belong to the genus Notoxus:

References

Tenebrionoidea genera
Anthicidae